Lake Ouachita (Pronounced WAH-shi-tah) is a reservoir created by the damming of the Ouachita River by Blakely Mountain Dam.

Blakely Mountain Dam was built by the United States Army Corps of Engineers from 1948 to 1953 for hydroelectric power, recreation, water supply and wildlife conservation.

The lake is located near Hot Springs, Arkansas. Lake Ouachita is the largest lake completely in Arkansas, as the larger  Bull Shoals Lake extends into Missouri. It is completely surrounded by the Ouachita National Forest. Lake Ouachita is located near two other lakes, Lake Hamilton and Lake Catherine. These three lakes, DeGray Lake to the near south, and the thermal springs of Hot Springs National Park make Hot Springs a popular tourist getaway.

Largemouth Bass, Small Mouth Bass, Spotted Bass, Bream, Crappie, Catfish, Walleye and world class Trophy Striped Bass await the angler. Lake Ouachita has rare jellyfish (non-stinging) and sponges found in very few freshwater lakes. Scuba divers from all over the world enjoy the underwater experience as well as the special spear fishing season.

The original purpose of Lake Ouachita was flood control and hydroelectricity. One feature by the Corps of Engineers is the Geo-Float Trail, a marked trail which can be followed with a brochure which details prominent geological features along the route. Lake Ouachita features one of the largest crystal veins in the world.

Vegetation covers 10% of the lake. Lake Ouachita's vegetation is being addressed by the U.S. Army Corps of Engineers, the Arkansas Game and Fish Commission, and the Lake Ouachita Association to control the hydrilla and Eurasian watermilfoil. The goal of the project is to contain and reduce — not to eradicate — the vegetation, since the presence of aquatic vegetation in moderate amounts is beneficial to the lake's fishery. Treatment will be concentrated on high recreational use areas, such as swimming beaches, around marinas and popular boating areas. Areas of the lake with good fish habitat will not be treated.

See also 
 List of Arkansas dams and reservoirs

References

External links

Corps of Engineers – Lake Ouachita
 http://www.lakeouachita.org
 https://www.stripers247.com/Arkansas-Stripers.php
 http://lakeouachitavistatrail.org

Ouachita
Ouachita
Protected areas of Garland County, Arkansas
Protected areas of Montgomery County, Arkansas
Arkansas placenames of Native American origin
Buildings and structures in Garland County, Arkansas
Buildings and structures in Montgomery County, Arkansas
Dams in Arkansas
United States Army Corps of Engineers dams
Dams completed in 1953
Bodies of water of Garland County, Arkansas
Bodies of water of Montgomery County, Arkansas
1953 establishments in Arkansas
Ouachita River